Brooklyn Kevin Ezeh (born 23 June 2001) is a German professional footballer who plays as a left-back for 3. Liga club SV Wehen Wiesbaden.

Career
Ezeh is a former youth academy player of Hamburger SV and Schalke 04. On 18 January 2022, he moved to 3. Liga club Viktoria Berlin. He made his professional debut on 22 January 2022 in a 2–0 league defeat against 1. FC Kaiserslautern.

In July 2022, Ezeh signed a two-year contract with SV Wehen Wiesbaden until June 2024.

References

External links
 
 

2001 births
Living people
Footballers from Hamburg
Association football defenders
German footballers
3. Liga players
Regionalliga players
FC Schalke 04 II players
FC Viktoria 1889 Berlin players
SV Wehen Wiesbaden players
German people of Nigerian descent